Danyi may refer to:

Danyi Prefecture, a prefecture of Togo
Danyi Deats (born 1967), American actor and producer
Gábor Danyi (born 1964), Hungarian handball player